The 2023 Memphis Tigers football team represented the University of Memphis in the 2023 NCAA Division I FBS football season. The Tigers played their home games at Liberty Bowl Memorial Stadium in Memphis, Tennessee, and competed in the American Athletic Conference (The American). They were led by fourth-year head coach Ryan Silverfield.

Previous season

The Tigers finished the 2022 season 7–6, 3–5 in Sun Belt play to finish in last eight place in the conference. The Tigers beat Utah State 38–10 in the First Responder Bowl.

Schedule
Memphis and the American Athletic Conference (AAC) announced the 2023 football schedule on February 21, 2023.

References

Memphis
Memphis Tigers football seasons
Memphis Tigers football